Ondřej Steiner (born February 11, 1974) is a Czech former professional ice hockey centre.

Steiner played a total of 335 games in the Czech Extraliga for HC Plzeň, HC Karlovy Vary, HC Slavia Praha, HC Litvínov and Vsetínská hokejová. He also played in the SM-liiga for Ässät, HPK, Lukko and Pelicans as well as in the Russian Superleague for HC Khimik Voskresensk.

Steiner was drafted 59th overall by the Buffalo Sabres in the 1992 NHL Entry Draft but remained in the Czech Republic and never played in North America.

References

External links

1974 births
Living people
Ässät players
HC Baník Sokolov players
HC Benátky nad Jizerou players
Buffalo Sabres draft picks
Czech ice hockey centres
HPK players
HC Karlovy Vary players
HC Khimik Voskresensk players
Lahti Pelicans players
HC Litvínov players
Lukko players
IHC Písek players
HC Plzeň players
HC Slavia Praha players
Sportspeople from Plzeň
Stjernen Hockey players
VHK Vsetín players
Czech expatriate ice hockey players in Finland
Czech expatriate ice hockey players in Russia
Czech expatriate sportspeople in Norway
Czech expatriate sportspeople in Denmark
Expatriate ice hockey players in Norway
Expatriate ice hockey players in Denmark
Czechoslovak ice hockey centres